This is a list of airport rail link systems which connect airports with cities in various countries.

Main-line or commuter rail

High-speed rail and intercity rail link

Asia

Europe

North America

Express, regional, commuter train

Africa

Asia

Europe

North America

Oceania

South America

Light rail, metro or other types

Africa

Asia

Europe

North America

Oceania

South America

Proposed airport rail links 

Other cities are considering airport rail link services.

Africa

 Alexandria, Egypt
 Algiers, Algeria - the Algiers Metro has plans for expansion to Houari Boumediene Airport.
 Cape Town, South Africa – a R3.5 billion rail link between Cape Town International Airport and Cape Town Station is planned to start construction in 2013.
 Lagos, Nigeria - Murtala Muhammed International Airport will be served by the Lagos Rail Mass Transit.

Asia
 Ankara's Esenboğa Airport via Ankara Metro M5 Line
 Dubai Metro – Purple Line – express route between Dubai International Airport and Al Maktoum International Airport 
 İzmir's Adnan Menderes Airport via İzmir Metro M3 Line
 Johor Bahru's Senai International Airport via KTM Komuter Southern Sector.
 Kolkata's Netaji Subhash Chandra Bose International Airport via Kolkata Metro lines 4 and 6, replacing the previous Kolkata Suburban Railway link
 Manila
 Clark International Airport via the North–South Commuter Railway
 Ninoy Aquino International Airport via the Metro Manila Subway and the LRT Line 6B extension
 New Manila International Airport via the MRT Line 7 northward extension
 Nur-Sultan's Nursultan Nazarbayev International Airport via Nur-Sultan Light Metro

Europe
 Alicante Airport is to be connected by a spur of the commuter line between Alicante and Elche around 2025.
 Belgrade Airport is to be connected with city via airport express bus. Airport is currently connected with public transport's line 72, but it runs on every 30–40 minutes and ride is around 60 to 90 minutes long. There are also plans for constructing rail link.
 Bristol Airport – in July 2016 a report was produced outlining proposals to improve access from the city to the airport, including a light or heavy rail link.
 Bucharest Otopeni Airport to be linked via Bucharest Metro Line M6 to the Bucharest Metro network
 Ciudad Real Airport has an agreement with Adif to build a station in the nearby Madrid-Sevilla high-speed and Ciudad Real-Badajoz rail lines providing a fast link to Ciudad Real, Puertollano, Madrid and Córdoba.
 Dublin Airport in Dublin, Ireland is one of the main destinations of the (in planning) Dublin Metro.
 EuroAirport (serving Basel and Mulhouse, France) is proposed to be linked to the railway network via :de:Flughafenbahnhof EuroAirport as well as an extension of the Basel tram network already serving nearby Saint Louis (Haut Rhin).
 A new underground rail station is planned at Göteborg Landvetter Airport as part of the new Gothenburg-Borås rail link.
 There are talks of reopening part of a rail line crossing the Hunsrück-mountains to connect Hahn airport to the rail network with construction starting by 2016. This has been delayed.
 A number of additional transport proposals for London Heathrow Airport are being considered.
 Helsinki Airport via Lentorata
 New Herakleion Airport in Kastelli Pediadas (2025) with train from Herakleion, proposed by the bigger opposition and the group of the citizens Railway in Crete
 Luxembourg Airport via an extension of the existing tram system
 Patras (Araxos Airport) with trains from Patras, Achagia and Lappa
 Prague Ruzyně Airport, proposed in 2008
 Stockholm Skavsta Airport will gain a high-speed rail link as part of the East Link Project.
 Stuttgart 21 is set to include a high-speed railway station for Stuttgart Airport. Likewise Stuttgart Stadtbahn is being extended to the airport.
 Tbilisi International Airport via Tbilisi Metro
 Tirana International Airport Nënë Tereza via a spur off the Durrës–Tiranë railway

North America

Calgary International Airport – plans are being developed to extend the C-Train to the airport in the northeast of the city in the long term.
Dallas/Fort Worth International Airport – DART's Silver Line. Initially planned to open in 2013, still in process. The service will run west to east, connecting Grapevine, Texas to Plano, Texas.
Edmonton International Airport – an extension of the LRT is proposed to connect to downtown.
Houston
An extension of the METRORail Red Line is proposed to connect to George Bush Intercontinental Airport.
An extension of the METRORail Purple Line and METRORail Green Line is proposed to connect to William P. Hobby Airport.
Las Vegas has an ongoing discussion about extending the monorail into McCarran International Airport. Also in the Vegas area, the planned Ivanpah Airport is sited on the right of way for the proposed maglev demonstration project.
Montreal-Pierre Elliott Trudeau International Airport – the under construction Réseau express métropolitain will connect the airport to Downtown Montreal.
Newark Liberty International Airport is planned to be served by an extension of the PATH's Newark–World Trade Center line.
New York City
 LaGuardia Airport has been proposed to be reached by extensions of the New York City Subway's BMT Astoria Line (currently serving the ). The most recent plan, AirTrain LaGuardia, is in the planning stages and proposed to open in 2023.
John F. Kennedy International Airport is already served by AirTrain JFK, but the AirTrain is proposed for possible extension to Midtown Manhattan via existing rail lines.
Ottawa Macdonald–Cartier International Airport – Line 4 is a new line under construction in Ottawa. It will connect the airport with an extension of  via the EY Centre. Construction is expected to be completed in 2022, and will connect the airport to the rest of the O-Train system.
Sacramento International Airport – future plans call for a light rail line that would connect to Sacramento Station.
St. Petersburg-Clearwater International Airport – A light rail station is planned as part of a 16-station LRT system currently in the planning phase.
Toronto Pearson International Airport – Toronto Subway's Line 5 Eglinton or Line 6 Finch West LRT lines are two potential links planned to be extended to the airport in the future. As of 2020, the Line 5 Eglinton West Extension is in the planning stages and will open by 2030–2031. Metrolinx is also studying to divert the Kitchener line towards the proposed Regional Transit Centre and once fully completed, the transit centre will link the airport with the majority of the Greater Toronto Area by rail, provide a new terminal adjacent to the centre and relieve Union Station in Toronto.

South America

Oceania
Gold Coast, Australia
There have been numerous proposals to extend the Gold Coast railway line and/or the Gold Coast light rail to the Gold Coast Airport.
Melbourne, Australia:
Melbourne Airport – Proposed rail connection between Melbourne's CBD and Melbourne Airport. The most recent proposal is in the planning stages and proposed to begin construction in 2022 and open in 2031.
Avalon Airport – In 2014, land reservation was set aside for a future branch line off the Geelong line near Lara Station to Avalon Airport, and funding for preliminary planning was provided for in the Victorian state budget.

See also
 List of airport people mover systems

References

Airport rail link